Richard Vanigli (born 1 June 1971 in Forlì) is an Italian former footballer, currently in charge as Cristiano Lucarelli's assistant coach at Catania.

Playing career
A hard-working centre-back, he started playing in the lower leagues, making his Serie B debut with Cosenza in 1993, and his Serie A debut with Lecce in 1996.

In 1998 he joined Livorno, playing six years for the Tuscans throughout three different divisions (from Serie C1 to Serie A). In 2004 he left Livorno for Empoli, winning a second personal Serie A promotion on his first season.

On 19 February 2006, Richard Vanigli fouled Francesco Totti, which suffered a fracture of his left fibula and ligament damage. Totti had to make an amazing quick recovery to participate in the victorious 2006 World Cup, in just about 2 months.

Vanigli is therefore mostly remembered in the Italian football scene for putting Totti’s career at risk.

In 2009, he left professional football to move back at hometown club Forlì in the Eccellenza league.

Coaching career
After retirement, he stayed at Forlì as youth coach, and then also as head coach from December 2014 to March 2015.

He successively followed former teammate (turned manager) Cristiano Lucarelli, serving as his assistant at 
Tuttocuoio, Messina and most recently Catania.

References

External links
 

1971 births
Living people
Italian footballers
A.C. Ancona players
Empoli F.C. players
S.S.D. Varese Calcio players
Cosenza Calcio 1914 players
U.S. Livorno 1915 players
A.S.D. Castel di Sangro Calcio players
U.S. Lecce players
A.C. Milan players
People from Forlì
Serie A players
Association football defenders
Footballers from Emilia-Romagna
Sportspeople from the Province of Forlì-Cesena